Robert Charles Frost Gordon (March 19, 1920 – June 12, 2001) was an American diplomat, appointed as U.S. Ambassador to Mauritius. He graduated with a B.A. in 1941 and an M.A. (1949) from the University of California at Berkeley.

From 1941 to 1946, Gordon was with the Bethlehem Steel Corp., and from 1946 to 1948, he was with Tri-Metals Corp. He joined the U.S. Foreign Service in 1950 and served as a foreign affairs analyst at the U.S. State Department and then as a political officer in Baghdad and Khartoum.

In 1961 to 1963, he was a personnel officer at the State Department, and he attended the National War College from 1963 to 1964. From then on until 1965, he was Deputy Chief of Mission in Dar es Salaam.

From 1965 to 1970, Gordon was the counselor for political-military affairs in Rome. He then was special assistant for welfare and grievances at the State Department from 1970 to 1972. From 1972 to 1978, he was the consul general in Florence.

Gordon was appointed by Jimmy Carter to be United States Ambassador to Mauritius in 1980. He would replace Samuel Rhea Gammon III, who resigned. He was coordinator for the handicapped at the State Department from 1978 to 1980.

References

External links
Picture, Alumni List Berkerley University of California

1920 births
Ambassadors of the United States to Mauritius
2001 deaths
United States Foreign Service personnel
20th-century American diplomats
University of California, Berkeley alumni
American expatriates in Iraq
American expatriates in Sudan
American expatriates in Tanzania